La Forêt-Sainte-Croix is a commune in the Essonne department in Île-de-France which is in northern France.

Inhabitants of La Forêt-Sainte-Croix are known as Sylvaniens.

See also
Communes of the Essonne department

References

External links

Mayors of Essonne Association 

Communes of Essonne